is a song recorded by Japanese singer Aimyon from her third studio album Heard That There's Good Pasta. It was released on April 17, 2019, through Unborde and Warner Music Japan, as her ninth single. The song was featured as a theme for the 2019 animation movie Crayon Shin-chan: Honeymoon Hurricane – The Lost Hiroshi.

"Haru no Hi" expresses the male perspective of Hiroshi Nohara, Shinosuke's father, which reflects love of Nohara family, beginning at Kita-Senju Station in Tokyo. The accompanying music video, directed by Tomokazu Yamada at Izu Peninsula, was premiered on March 11.

Track listing

Personnel

 Aimyon – vocals, acoustic guitar
 Yoshiyuki Yatsuhashi – acoustic guitar, electric guitar
 Michihiko Nakanishi (Yasei Collective) – bass
 Ken'ichi Shirane – drums
 Yusuke Tatsuzaki – programming, other instruments
 Yusuke Tanaka – programming, other instruments

Charts

Weekly charts

Monthly charts

Year-end charts

Certifications

References

2019 singles
2019 songs
Aimyon songs
Animated series theme songs
Anime songs
Japanese-language songs
Warner Music Japan singles
Unborde singles